The 1988 Humboldt State Lumberjacks football team represented Humboldt State University during the 1988 NCAA Division II football season. Humboldt State competed in the Northern California Athletic Conference in 1988.

The 1988 Lumberjacks were led by third-year head coach Mike Dolby. They played home games at the Redwood Bowl in Arcata, California. Humboldt State finished with a record of four wins and six losses (4–6, 2–3 NCAC). The Lumberjacks were outscored by their opponents 173–266 for the season.

Schedule

Team players in the NFL
No Humboldt State players were selected in the 1989 NFL Draft.

The following finished their college career in 1988, were not drafted, but played in the NFL.

Notes

References

Humboldt State
Humboldt State Lumberjacks football seasons
Humboldt State Lumberjacks football